Edna Foster was a child star at Biograph who was active during Hollywood's silent era. She often played boys' roles and was known for her character named Billy; Biograph even promoted her as Billy Foster.

She was born in Boston to Conrad Foster — a theater owner and eventual mayor of Traverse City, Michigan — and his wife, Annie. Edna had several siblings; her older sister Flora Foster (who died as a teenager of heart failure) was a child actress as well. Edna seems to have retired from the film industry after her sister's death. According to her father's 1940 obituary, she was still alive, unmarried, and living in New York City.

Selected filmography 

 Men and Women (1914)
 The Escape (1914)
 A Nest Unfeathered (1914)
 The Little Tease (1913)
 A Misappropriated Turkey (1913) 
 With the Enemy's Help (1912)
 A String of Pearls (1912)
 The Sunbeam (1912)
 The Transformation of Mike (1912)
 For His Son (1912)
 The Battle (1911)
 The Adventures of Billy (1911) 
 A Country Cupid (1911)
 The Lonedale Operator (1911)

References 

Actresses from Boston
American silent film actresses
1900 births
Year of death missing